Govenia fasciata is a species of orchid endemic to Venezuela.

References

fasciata
Orchids of Venezuela
Plants described in 1843